The Danish East India Company refers to two separate Danish-Norwegian chartered companies. The first company operated between 1616 and 1650. The second company existed between 1670 and 1729, however, in 1730 it was re-founded as the Asiatic Company.

First company

The first Danish East India Company was chartered in 1616 under King Christian IV and focused on trade with India. The first expedition, under Admiral Gjedde, took two years to reach Ceylon, losing more than half their crew. The island had been claimed by Portugal by the time they arrived but on 10May 1620, a treaty was concluded with the Kingdom of Kandy and the foundation laid of a settlement at Trincomalee on the island's east coast. They occupied the colossal Koneswaram temple in May 1620 to begin fortification of the peninsula before being expelled by the Portuguese. After landing on the Indian mainland, a treaty was concluded with the ruler of the Tanjore Kingdom,
Raghunatha Nayak, who gave the Danes possession of the town of Tranquebar, and permission to trade in the kingdom by treaty of 19November 1620. In Tranquebar they established Dansborg and installed Captain Crappe as the first governor (opperhoved) of Danish India. The treaty was renewed on 30July 1621, and afterwards renewed and confirmed on the 10May 1676, by Shivaji the founder of the Maratha Empire.

During their heyday, the Danish East India Company and Swedish East India Company imported more tea than the British East India Company, smuggling 90% of it into England, where it could be sold at a huge profit. Between 1624-36, Danish trade extended to Surat, Bengal, Java, and Borneo, with factories in Masulipatam, Surat, Balasore and at Java, but subsequent European wars in which Denmark participated ruined the Company, and trade in India ceased entirely between 1643–69, during which time all previous acquisitions were lost except Tranquebar, which held out until aid from Denmark arrived in 1669.

Second company, and the Asiatic Company
In 1670, a second Danish East India Company was established, before it too was dissolved in 1729. In 1730, it was refounded as the Asiatic Company and opened trade with Qing China at Canton. The first expedition went badly, with Den gyldne Løve lost with its cargo of silver off Ballyheigue, Ireland, on the outbound journey. Local landowners held the silver at their estate and pursued a salvage claim, but a gang of locals overpowered the Danish guard and made off with the hoard, causing a diplomatic row between Denmark-Norway and Britain. With the royal licence conferred in 1732, the new company was granted a 40-year monopoly on all Danish trade east of the Cape of Good Hope. Before 1750, it sent 27 ships; 22 survived the journey to return to Copenhagen. In 1772, the company lost its monopoly and in 1779, Danish India became a crown colony.

During the Napoleonic Wars, in 1801 and again in 1807, the British Royal Navy attacked Copenhagen. As a consequence of the last attack (in which the entire Dano-Norwegian navy was captured), Denmark (one of few Western European countries not occupied by Napoleon), ceded the island of Heligoland (part of the Duchy of Holstein-Gottorp) to Britain. In the east, when news of Anglo-Danish hostilities reached India, the British immediately seized seven Danish merchant ships on 28 January 1808 that were in the Hoogli. Denmark finally sold its remaining settlements in mainland India in 1845 and the Danish Gold Coast in 1850, both to the British.

Ships

 Kiøbenhavn and Christian (1618–1621, part of the Gjedde expedition that founded Dansborg at Tranquebar)
 Christianshavn (8 November 1639, Willem Leyel left Denmark for Tranquebar as commander of this ship)
 Flyvende Ulv (Departure from Copenhagen 1682 with Axel Juhl, who was appointed governor of Tranquebar later the same year. Departure from Copenhagen 1685 with Wollf Heinrich v. Calnein, governor of Tranquebar 1687)
 Cron Printz Christian (Cron Printzen) and Den gyldne Løve (1730–31, the Tønder expedition that opened trade with China - Den gyldne Løve was shipwrecked in Ireland)
 Elephant(en) (1747–1750) The ship was lost on 15 August 1750 in "Mosele Bay", near the Cape of Good Hope. There were 35 survivors; they were rescued by Onwerkirk. Elephant was on a voyage from Tranquebar, India to Copenhagen.
 Grev Moltke (1760, first Moravian missionaries)
 Nicobar Sunk 1783 with load of Swedish Plate Money.
Disco (1778 ship), frigate built for the Danish navy and named for Disko Island, but transferred to Danish EIC before maiden voyage.
Hussar, purchased 1783.
Holsten (I), renamed from Det Store Bælt,  declared unseaworthy and condemned at Mauritius in 1807
Holsten (II) purchased in 1806 from the French at Mauritius and renamed to replace Holsten (I). Seized by the British (HMS Modeste (1793), HMS Terpsichore (1785) and HMS Dasher) on the Hooghly in January 1808. Six other Danish ships were seized at the same time

See also

 Danish India
 Danish Mission College
 Tranquebar Mission
 Danish West India Company
 British East India Company
 Assada Company, English trading company, founded 1635 and ceased 1657
 Austrian East India Company, founded 1775 and ceased 1785
 Dutch East India Company, founded 1602 and ceased 1798
 French East India Company, founded 1664 and ceased 1769
 Portuguese East India Company, founded 1628 and ceased 1633
 Swedish East India Company, founded 1731 and ceased 1813
 List of trading companies
 Whampoa anchorage

References

External links
Article in Danish
Projekt Runeberg Danish biographical lexicon, in Danish
Denmark during the Age of the French Revolution, 1790-1814
WorldStatesmen- India

Chartered companies
Danish India
Trading companies
Colonial Indian companies
1616 establishments in Denmark
Companies established in 1616
Defunct companies of Denmark